Moščanci (in older sources also Moštjanci) is a village in the Municipality of Puconci in the Prekmurje region of Slovenia.

References

External links
Moščanci on Geopedia

Populated places in the Municipality of Puconci